Anthony Gaitor (born October 9, 1988) is a former American football cornerback. He was drafted by the Tampa Bay Buccaneers in the seventh round of the 2011 NFL Draft. He played college football at Florida International. He currently is a defensive quality control assistant for Florida International Football.

High school
A native of Miami, Gaitor attended Miami Northwestern High School, where he was part of an immensely talented squad that also included future NFL players Lavonte David, Marcus Forston, Jacory Harris, Tommy Streeter, Sean Spence, and Brandon Washington. Regarded as only a two-star recruit by Rivals.com, Gaitor was not listed among the top cornerbacks of his class.

College career
Gaitor attended Florida International University from 2007 to 2010. In his career, he accumulated 197 total tackles, including 19 for loss, four sacks, 11 interceptions (three which he returned for touchdowns), and 35 passes defended.

Professional career

Tampa Bay Buccaneers
Gaitor was selected by the Tampa Bay Buccaneers in the seventh round, 222nd overall, of the 2011 NFL Draft. On August 26, 2013, he was placed on injured-reserve, thus ending his 2013 season.

Miami Dolphins
Gaitor signed with the Miami Dolphins on May 28, 2014.

Tampa Bay Buccaneers
On July 28, 2014, the Tampa Bay Buccaneers re-signed Gaitor. The Buccaneers released Gaitor on August 29, 2014.

Arizona Cardinals
Gaitor signed with the Arizona Cardinals practice squad on August 31, 2014. On October 28, 2014, he was released from Arizona's practice squad.

BC Lions
Gaitor signed with the BC Lions of the Canadian Football League (CFL) on February 25, 2016, and was released by the team on June 3, 2016. He was recalled July 24, 2016. Gaiter played in 11 games for the Lions in 2016, contributing 35 tackles, 2 interceptions, 1 forced fumble, and 1 defensive touchdown. He was released by the Lions on January 9, 2017, allowing him to pursue an NFL contract.

New Orleans Saints
Later that same day (January 9, 2017) Gaitor signed a reserve/future contract with the New Orleans Saints. He was waived by the Saints on May 15, 2017.

References

External links
Tampa Bay Buccaneers bio
FIU Golden Panthers bio

1988 births
Living people
Miami Northwestern Senior High School alumni
Players of American football from Miami
American football cornerbacks
Canadian football defensive backs
American players of Canadian football
FIU Panthers football players
Tampa Bay Buccaneers players
Miami Dolphins players
Arizona Cardinals players
BC Lions players
New Orleans Saints players
Winnipeg Blue Bombers players
Players of Canadian football from Miami